Events in the year 1999 in Germany.

Incumbents
President - Roman Herzog (until 30 June), Johannes Rau (starting 1 July)
Chancellor – Gerhard Schröder

Elections

 1999 German presidential election
 1999 European Parliament election in Germany
 1999 Brandenburg state election
 1999 Bremen state election
 1999 Hessian state election
 1999 Saarland state election
 1999 Saxony state election

Events

 February 10–21 - 49th Berlin International Film Festival
 March 12 - Germany in the Eurovision Song Contest 1999
 April 1 - German company Infineon Technologies was founded.
 April 12: Wuppertal Suspension Railway accident
 April 19: Reichstag building in Berlin opens the public for the first time in 66 years.
 June 18–20: The 25th G8 summit is held in Cologne.
 July 1: The final parliamentary meeting in Bonn marks the government is officially moved to Berlin. 
 November 4: A court in Augsburg filed an arrest warrant for Walther Leisler Kiep due to the CDU donations scandal.
 Date unknown: German company  Hoechst AG merged with French company Rhône-Poulenc  to form French company Aventis, which was formed to French Company Sanofi in 2004.

Births
 June 11 – Kai Havertz, German footballer
 November 8 – Isaac Bonga, German basketball player

Deaths

January 2 - Sebastian Haffner, German author and journalist (born 1907)
January 18 - Günter Strack, German actor (born 1929)
January 24 - Werner Jacobs German film director (born 1909)
February 12 - Heinz Schubert, German actor and comedian (born 1925)
February 19 - Georg Meier, German motorcycle racer (born 1910)
March 6 - Klaus Gysi, German politician (born 1912)
April 12 - Helga Seibert, German judge (born 1939)
April 13 - Willi Stoph, German politician (born 1914)
May 22 - Alfred Kubel, German politician (born 1909)
June 23 - Carl Lange, German actor (born 1909)
June 27 - Siegfried Lowitz, German actor (born 1914)
July 5 - Harald Philipp, German film director, screenwriter and actor (born 1921)
August 4 - Liselott Linsenhoff, German equestrian (born 1927)
August 13 - Ignaz Bubis , President of Central Council of Jews in Germany (born 1927)
August 17 - Reiner Klimke, German equestrian (born 1936)
August 25 - Georg Thomalla, German actor (born 1915)
September 20 - Willy Millowitsch, German actor (born 1909)
October 17 - Franz Peter Wirth, German film director (born 1919)
October 26 - Rex Gildo, German singer (born 1936)
 November 2 - Ibrahim Böhme, German politician (born 1944)
November 26 - Angelika Hurwicz, German actress (born 1922)
December 11 - Harry Wüstenhagen, German actor (born 1928)

See also
1999 in German television

References

 
Years of the 20th century in Germany
1990s in Germany
Germany
Germany